Fortycoats & Co. was an Irish children's television drama series produced by RTÉ and broadcast on RTÉ One during the 1980s. The series was cancelled in the early 1990s.

Plot
The show featured the adventures of the title character Fortycoats (Fran Dempsey) - his catchphrase was "Be me forty coats and me fifty pockets" - and his companions Sofar Sogood (played by Conal Kearney), a prim goody two shoes character and Slightly Bonkers (played by Virginia Cole), a naive schoolgirl. They occupied the Flying Trick Shop (also known as the Flying Tuck Shop and the Flying Sweet Shop) and battled against the evil Wilhelmina, the Whirligig Witch (and her cat, Spooky) and the equally evil Pickarooney (who lived in a rubbish tip and kidnapped children).

Cast

Main cast
 Fran Dempsey as Fortycoats
 Virginia Cole as Slightly Bonkers
 Conal Kearney as Sofar Sogood

Guest Cast
 Laurie Morton as Wilhelmina, The Whirligig Witch
 Des Nealon as The Pickarooney
 Robert Carrickford as The Count
 Noel McGee as Timothy Tumbledown
 Maria McDermottroe as The Lilter
 Derry Power as Tony the Tailor
 Fiona MacGinty as Queen Roola Boola
 Vincent Smith as Utterly Bonkers
 Annie Kilmartin as Totally Bonkers
 Barbara McNamara as The Princess
 Gerry O'Brien as Sir Dashing the Bold

Voice actors
Paula Lambert as Spooky the Cat
 Davy Byrne as Demented Chicken

Production

Origins of Fortycoats

The name Johnny Fortycoats first appears in Dublin folklore in the 1930s. Although generally taken to be the nickname of a man called Patrick Marlow, it may perhaps have been applied to more than one person, including one of a couple of tramps who walked the coast of Dublin at the time of the television series. It was his habit to wear several coats, hence the nickname.

Wanderly Wagon

The show was a spin-off from Wanderly Wagon, in which Fortycoats was played by Bill Golding, who also played Rory. The in joke of the programme was that Fortycoats only ever visited in his flying sweetshop when Rory had gone off on some errand and Rory seemed to doubt Fortycoats existence because he never met him. When Goulding left the series, Fran Dempsey took over the heavily disguised role of Fortycoats but not that of Rory, who was written out.
Eugene Lambert (creator of Wanderly Wagon) said he had no involvement with the spin-off and described it as "a rehash of our programme".

References

External links

Fortycoats & Co. clip

Irish children's television shows
Irish television shows featuring puppetry
RTÉ original programming